Alisa Kano (born November 7, 1994) is an American group rhythmic gymnast. She represented the United States at the 2015 World Rhythmic Gymnastics Championships. As a member of the American group rhythmic gymnastics team, she won a gold and two silver medals at the 2015 Pan American Games and competed at the 2016 Summer Olympics. Kano graduated from Loyola University Chicago in 2019 with a degree in Exercise Science.

References

1994 births
Living people
Place of birth missing (living people)
American rhythmic gymnasts
Gymnasts at the 2015 Pan American Games
Pan American Games gold medalists for the United States
Pan American Games silver medalists for the United States
American sportspeople of Japanese descent
Pan American Games medalists in gymnastics
Medalists at the 2015 Pan American Games
21st-century American women